Louise Milligan is an Australian investigative reporter for the ABC TV 7.30 and Four Corners programs. As of March 2021, she is the author of two award-winning non-fiction books.

Career 
Born in Ireland, Milligan grew up in the Roman Catholic faith. She graduated from Monash University with an Arts/Law degree. Early in her career she was High Court reporter for The Australian. She subsequently spent seven years reporting for Seven News before joining ABC News.

Melbourne University Press (MUP) published Milligan's first book, Cardinal, in May 2017. A month later MUP withdrew the book from bookshops across Victoria in response to Victoria Police charging Cardinal George Pell with historic sex assault. Cardinal was returned to Victorian bookshops in February 2019. The charges against Pell were withdrawn in February 2019 for the "swimmers trial" and he was acquitted in April 2020 regarding the cathedral trial.

In 2019, she was invited to give the Castan Centre for Human Rights Law annual lecture. Her talk was titled "A journalist's defence of trial procedures".

Defamation suits 

In 2021, the Australian Commonwealth Attorney-General Christian Porter commenced defamation proceedings against her for an article published on 26 February 2021 which he says made a false rape allegation against him. Porter discontinued the action in May 2021 after the ABC agreed to post an editorial note to the original publication and to pay mediation costs.

In 2021, federal MP Andrew Laming commenced defamation proceedings against Milligan for four tweets sent on March 28, 2021. He alleged one tweet implied he admitted to illegally taking a photo of a woman's underwear as she bent over in Brisbane in 2019. In August 2021 Milligan agreed to pay Laming approximately $130,000 in damages and fees.

Awards and recognition

Reporting awards 

 2016 Golden Quill Award, Melbourne Press Club, winner with Andy Burn for ABC report, "George Pell and Sexual Abuse in the Catholic Church"
2017 Best reporting of an issue in sport, Sport Australia, winner with Lisa McGregor, Trish Drum for "After the Game" (Four Corners)
 2017 Law Reporting Award presented by the Sir Owen Dixon Chambers
 2019 Australian Press Council Press Freedom Medal

Book awards 

 2017 Walkley Book Award, winner for Cardinal
2018 True Crime and Debut, Davitt Award, shortlisted for Cardinal
2018 Civic Choice Award, Melbourne Prize for Literature, winner for Cardinal
 2021 Victorian Premier's Literary Awards, People's Choice Award, winner for Witness and Victorian Premier's Prize for Nonfiction, shortlisted for Witness
 2021 Stella Prize, shortlisted for Witness
2021 Colin Roderick Award, shortlisted for Witness
2021 True Crime Davitt Award, winner for Witness

Bibliography

Reviews of Milligan's work

References

External links 

 
 

Living people
Year of birth missing (living people)
Place of birth missing (living people)
Monash University alumni
Australian journalists
Australian non-fiction writers
21st-century Australian women writers
21st-century Australian writers